Shawashina (Al Shawashina, Ash-Shawashinah) is a desert town in the Al Wahat District in the Cyrenaica region of northeastern Libya.

It was in the former Ajdabiya District until 2007.

References

External links
Satellite map at Maplandia.com

Populated places in Al Wahat District
Cyrenaica